John Christopher Madsen (born May 9, 1983) is a former American football tight end. He was signed by the Oakland Raiders as an undrafted free agent in 2006. He played college football at Utah.

He was also member of the Cleveland Browns, Las Vegas Locomotives and Detroit Lions.

Early years
He graduated in 2001 from Hunter High School in West Valley City, Utah having never played football.  He played basketball in high school. He played college football for Snow College, his first organized team.

Professional career

Oakland Raiders
Originally a wide receiver, Madsen was converted to tight end in order to make the team. He was the only undrafted free agent to make the Raiders' main 53-man squad in 2006. Madsen was an exclusive-rights free agent in 2008 and re-signed on March 21. He was released by the team on September 20 after tight end Ben Troupe was signed.

Madsen was re-signed by the Raiders after offensive tackle Seth Wand was placed on injured reserve on October 6, 2008. He was released again on November 13.

Cleveland Browns
Madsen was signed by the Cleveland Browns on December 17, 2008 after tight end Steve Heiden was placed on injured reserve. He was waived on August 24, 2009.

Detroit Lions
Madsen signed with the Detroit Lions on May 11, 2010 but was waived on May 14.

External links

Utah Utes bio
Just Sports Stats

1983 births
Living people
Players of American football from Salt Lake City
American football wide receivers
American football tight ends
Snow Badgers football players
Utah Utes football players
Oakland Raiders players
Cleveland Browns players
Las Vegas Locomotives players
Detroit Lions players